The 1979 Chattanooga Moccasins football team represented the University of Chattanooga as a member of the Southern Conference (SoCon) during the 1979 NCAA Division I-A football season. Led by Joe Morrison in his seventh and final season as head coach, the Moccasins compiled an overall record of 9–2 with mark of 5–1 in conference play, winning the SoCon title for the third consecutive year.

Schedule

References

Chattanooga
Chattanooga Mocs football seasons
Southern Conference football champion seasons
Chattanooga Moccasins football